Promise Ring is the debut single by R&B singer Tiffany Evans from her self-titled debut album. It features Ciara. The song was produced by Mr. Collipark and The Clutch. It was officially released to iTunes on May 29, 2007. Once released, the song began to receive airplay on mainstream radio stations. It is Evans' most successful single to date.

Music video
The music video for Promise Ring mainly features Tiffany Evans dancing along with Ciara in the background. In the beginning, Evans is seen checking her MySpace page at her house with a television screen showing Ciara. Afterwards, Tiffany Evans does a dance routine ending with a guy putting a "Promise Ring" necklace around her neck.

Track listing
US Vinyl, 12" 
A1 Promise Ring [Radio Version] 3:57 Featuring Ciara
A2 Promise Ring [Instrumental] 4:27
B1 Promise Ring [Album Version] 4:27 Featuring Ciara
B2 Promise Ring [A Capella] 4:26 Featuring Ciara

Chart positions

References

2007 singles
Ciara songs
Songs written by Ciara
Tiffany Evans songs
2007 songs
Columbia Records singles
Songs written by Ezekiel Lewis
Songs written by Balewa Muhammad
Songs written by Candice Nelson (songwriter)
Songs written by Mr. Collipark